Superstition is an album by organist Shirley Scott recorded in 1973 and released on the Cadet label.

Track listing 
All compositions by Shirley Scott except where noted
 "Hanky's Panky" - 7:49   
 "Lady Madonna" (John Lennon, Paul McCartney) - 6:13   
 "Last Tango in Paris" (Gato Barbieri) - 6:56   
 "Superstition" (Stevie Wonder) - 4:11   
 "People Make The World Go 'Round" (Linda Creed, Thom Bell) - 4:57   
 "Liberation Song" - 4:39   
 "Rainy Days and Mondays Always Get Me Down" (Paul Williams, Roger Nichols) - 4:55

Personnel 
 Shirley Scott - organ
 Arthur Hoyle, Murray Watson - trumpet, flugelhorn (tracks 6 & 7)
 Jimmy Owens - trumpet (tracks 1-5)
 Clifford Davis (tracks 6 & 7), Ramon Morris (tracks 1-5) - tenor saxophone
 Jimmy Ponder (tracks 6 & 7), David Spinozza (tracks 1-5) - guitar
 Ron Carter (tracks 6 & 7), Richard Evans (tracks 1-5) - bass
 Grady Tate - drums
 Frederick "Derf" Walker - congas
 Richard Evans - arranger

References 

1973 albums
Albums produced by Esmond Edwards
Cadet Records albums
Shirley Scott albums